Aleanca për të Ardhmen was a coalition for the Albanian local elections of 2011. The alliance existed of:

See also
Coalition of the Citizen

References

Political party alliances in Albania
Socialist Party of Albania